The Saint Joseph Parish, otherwise known as the Las Piñas Church or Bamboo Organ Church, is a parish church in Las Piñas, just south of the city of Manila in the Philippines. It nestles in the heart of Barangay Daniel Fajardo, one of the oldest districts of Las Piñas. The church is renowned to house the Bamboo Organ, a pipe organ made mostly with bamboo pipes.  To the right of the church is an old Spanish convent converted into a gift shop and the entrance for observing the organ up close. Also in the church complex is St. Joseph's Academy, a primary and secondary education school established in 1914.

The parish falls under the jurisdiction of the Roman Catholic Diocese of Parañaque. The parish priest is Rev. Msgr. Roberto A. Olaguer, P.C. since July 11, 2020.

History

Establishment
On November 5, 1795, the Archbishop of Manila assigned Las Piñas, then a small town of farmers and fishermen, to the Augustinian Recollects to establish a new church.  Fray Diego Cera de la Virgen del Carmen, a native of Spain, traveled from Mabalacat, Pampanga province and arrived on the town on the day after Christmas of 1795.  Soon after, he started building the church made from adobe (volcanic) stones in the Earthquake Baroque architectural style.

The new parish priest was a very gifted man. He was a natural scientist, chemist, architect, community leader, as well as organist and organ builder.  He also built the organs for the Manila Cathedral and San Nicolas de Tolentino Church, the main Augustinian church in the old walled city of Manila.  In 1816, when the stone church was almost complete, he started building the organ made of bamboo and completed the instrument in 1824.

Fray Diego Cera served as the parish priest of Las Piñas till May 15, 1832, when he could no longer perform his duties due to severe illness. He died on June 24, 1832, in Manila.

Architectural History of Las Piñas Church

Initial construction
During that period, Las Piñas was a third class municipality. The natives were mostly salt bed tenders, fishermen, farmers, laborers, embroiderers, and others engaged in small businesses. Despite the condition of the parish, Fr. Cera set a goal to construct a temporary chapel and convent near the seashore made out of nipa and bamboo. The inhabitants, which were only 1200 before, saw his dedication and in return helped him in construction by means of manual labor or donating construction materials.

Evolution of architecture style
From perishable materials, the natives, together with Fr. Cera, aspired of establishing a stone church. It will serve as the inhabitant's protection from outsiders and natural calamities. In 1797, Fr. Cera bought the present site of the church for only one hundred and fifty pesos. There was an existing house standing at that period, which belonged to the Recollect estate.
He initiated and drew architectural plans for the stone church. While the foundations were being laid, big store rooms were built to keep construction materials. After three years, Fr. Cera requested for polistas or townspeople to render the construction of the church. The request was granted and they were only given free food, equivalent to their compensation. In 1813, religious activities were held temporarily at the old chapel. in 1816, the church's roof was completed and painting of walls began. 
With the cooperation of all 300 families in the city, the stone church was finished in 1819. It resembles solemn simplicity - truly an Earthquake Baroque architectural style.

Newly-constructed stone church
The church had three naves, a dome, side altars with Romanesque-styled tables, crypt stones each with a replica of the "Nuestra Señora dela Consolacion" on one side and St. Augustine on the other, a baptistry with a stone altar, and two sacristies with two wall closets each and a table with six drawers in one, and a tower with three posts topped by a spire.  An antique statue of St. Joseph and life-size statue of the dead Christ, bought from San Dionisio, Parañaque in the amount of 2 dozen (24pcs) eggs, were also among the first religious objects owned by the parish.

1829 Earthquakes

The stone church and the parochial house was destroyed by three earthquakes on January 18, July 29, and September 30, 1829. Don Jose Rueda, former Gobernadorcillo (1925) of the town of Las Piñas concisely described the damages wrought to the church. According to him, the two arches were cracked, two naves and walls were destroyed, and the whole roof of the church including its cross beams and its dome were ruined. All the wooden structures inside the church were left standing in the midst of the rain.

Restoration efforts of Fr. Cera
Fr. Cera did not only solidify his name in building the stone church, but also in terms of architectural restoration. According to the remarks of the Most Reverend Jose Sequi, Archbishop of Manila, after visiting Las Piñas Church on October 29, 1831, he was amazed by the restoration works. He expressed thus: "After I have seen the beautiful church of this place which was the work of the parish priest and also the very delicate adornments done in spite of the poverty of the town, and for his (Cera's) effort to procure the best for his church even without the help he needed, the Holy Mother Church is rendering unto him the utmost gratitude and concern."

Second Restoration
Between 1971 and 1975, the church was restored by Francisco Mañosa and Partners, with Architect Ludwig Alvarez, through the administration of Rev. Fr. Mark Lesage, to bring back the 19th-century look of the church and to re-position the main altar to face the people, as required by the new Ecumenical Church guidelines. The assessment revealed that the Las Piñas Church was in a depressing state due to:

 Heavily plastered walls,
 Aquamarine wall paint finish, and 
 Few fluorescent tubes hanging from the ceiling

The repair works were conducted such as removal of plaster, ranging from 3-4 inches thick, and removal of debris. A 9-inch clay pot was discovered during the course of repair works in the church. It was believed to be as old as the church and even contained pieces of gold which enabled Fr. Mark to continue the restoration works. The walls and the Bamboo Organ were the remaining parts of the original church. The original thatch roof was burned twice, thus, replaced with galvanized sheets. The major portion of the restoration of the exterior walls was cleaned to reveal the original walls. Missing stones were replaced with similar stones to limit the use of cement. Carved stones were provided by the high school students of St. Joseph Academy, as a part of their school project. Retablos, which accentuates the main altar, came from the Vatina - a store in Makati. All silver items, or retablos, were eventually donated by the owner of Vatina - after she attended a thanksgiving mass of the church. The original baptismal font, hewn out of stones, were discovered buried in the courtyard of the church. This was cleaned by Eduardo Castrillo, a notable sculptor. He also added a brass basin sculpture as his additional contribution.

On December 3, 1972, the newly restored church was inaugurated. The original framework were retained - complementary additions were executed. It features capiz chandeliers, aged bricks, old statues, bamboo ceiling,  a choir loft with antique balustrades of carved wood and potted native palms.

The event coincided with the return of the Las Piñas Bamboo Organ on March 13, 1975 after three years of rehabilitation in Bonn, Germany, reviving the organ back to its original state.

On May 9, 1975, the bamboo organ made its inaugural concert at the newly renovated church and surrounding buildings.

Construction of Bamboo Organ
See Bamboo Organ

Establishment of St. Joseph's Academy
In 1914, Belgian missionaries Fr. Jose van Runenkelen and Fr. Victor Zaiel of Congregatio Immaculati Cordis Mariae (CICM) established St. Joseph's School next to the church to foster literacy in the parish community.  The school, which started as a grade school, eventually included secondary education and was renamed as St. Joseph's Academy.

Recognition

Historical markers
The Las Piñas Church was designated as Historic Structure by the National Historical Commission of the Philippines with the placing of a historical marker in 1995.

On July 15, 2013, the Las Piñas Church was declared as a Historic Landmark by National Historical Institute.

Pastors
Below is the list of parish priests who served St. Joseph Church since the 1950s.

Saint Ezekiel Moreno used to be the parish priest of the church during his Philippine mission.

Significant Church Properties 
 The local parish houses the world-renowned Bamboo Organ.
 A statue of its first parish priest, Fray Diego Cera de la Virgen del Carmen, can be found a few meters in front of its belfry. The statue was a commissioned work of National Artist for Sculpture, Napoleon Abueva. It was inaugurated on July 27, 1995, coinciding with the church's 200th founding anniversary.
 An inscription in an old church bell of Las Piñas Church stating - "Siendo Cura-del Pueblo de Las Peñas el M.R.P. Padre Diego Cera se Fundio este equilon ano de 1820". During the time of Fr. Diego Cera, the name of the town was "Las Peñas" until it was changed to "Las Piñas".

Gallery

Other Notable Sites Within the Church Area
 The Thanksgiving Tree marker in front of the belfry and the Thanksgiving Tree that shades the statue of Padre Diego Cera which was planted by M/Sgt. Prof. Daniel Mateo Fajardo -to whom the barangay was named after.

See also
 Las Piñas Bamboo Organ
 Las Piñas Boys Choir

External links
 Music ecumenism marks 37th International Bamboo Organ Festival
 Remembering the Baroque period in the 38th International Bamboo Organ Festival
 Official Website of the Bamboo Organ Foundation

References

Baroque church buildings in the Philippines
Roman Catholic churches in Metro Manila
Buildings and structures in Las Piñas
Baroque architecture in the Philippines
Spanish Colonial architecture in the Philippines
Cultural Properties of the Philippines in Metro Manila
National Historical Landmarks of the Philippines
Marked Historical Structures of the Philippines
Josephian churches in the Philippines